Pieve Santa Mariona di Tàlcini is a ruined medieval pieve (church) in Corsica, in the territory of the commune of Corte in the department of Haute-Corse.

Formerly located in the heart of the old Diocese of Aleria, the Pieve was built probably in the twelfth and thirteenth century by craftsmen trained in Pisan architecture in Corsica. In a poor state of conservation, the twin apses and stone alignment can still be seen.

Archaeological surveys were undertaken in 1973, during which the badly damaged baptismal font located in the southern part of the nave was improved.

References

12th-century Roman Catholic church buildings in France
Churches in Corsica